38th Division or 38th Infantry Division may refer to:

Infantry divisions
 38th Division (German Empire)
 38th Landwehr Division (German Empire); see German Army order of battle, Western Front (1918)
 38th Infantry Division (Wehrmacht)
 38th SS-Grenadier-Division "Nibelungen"
 38th Infantry Division Puglie, Kingdom of Italy
 38th Division (Imperial Japanese Army)
 38th Infantry Division (Poland)
 38th Infantry Division (Russian Empire)
 38th Rifle Division (Soviet Union)
 38th Guards Mechanised Division, Soviet Union
 38th Guards Rifle Division, later 38th Guards Motor Rifle Division, Soviet Union
 38th (Welsh) Infantry Division, United Kingdom
 38th Infantry Division (United States)
 38th Division (Yugoslav Partisans)
 38th Infantry Division Dravska, Royal Yugoslav Army

Armoured divisions

 38th Tank Division (Soviet Union), part of 20th Mechanized Corps
 38th Division (Israel)

Aviation divisions
 38th Air Division, United States Air Force

See also
 38th Brigade (disambiguation)
 38th Regiment (disambiguation)
 38th Wing (disambiguation)
 38 Squadron (disambiguation)